Death's End is a science fiction novel by the Chinese writer Liu Cixin. It is the third novel in the trilogy titled Remembrance of Earth's Past, following the Hugo Award-winning novel The Three-Body Problem and its sequel, The Dark Forest. The original Chinese version was published in 2010. Ken Liu translated the English edition in 2016. It was a finalist for the 2017 Hugo Award for Best Novel and winner of the 2017 Locus Award for Best Science Fiction Novel.

Plot

Common Era and Crisis Era 
The story begins during the Fall of Constantinople (AD 1453), recounting a prostitute who gains the power of retrieving objects and human organs without penetrating their enclosures. Constantine XI tasks her with killing Mehmed II, but her powers are mysteriously lost, and she is killed by Byzantine soldiers in retaliation.

Next, the story shifts to the timeline of the beginning of The Three-Body Problem: The physicist Yang Dong, daughter of Ye Wenjie, having discovered her mother's conspiracy with Trisolaris, and witnessing the stultification of all particle accelerators, is eventually driven to suicide. Prior to her death, she meets another person at the lab (later revealed to be Ding Yi) who insists that life and geography on Earth evolved together, as opposed to the latter merely having enabled the former. Yang Dong, who knows that alien life is extremely common from secret documents of her mother, wonders how it has affected the universe and whether nature is really 'natural'.

Now, the time is the beginning of The Dark Forest: Around the time that Luo Ji is appointed as a Wallfacer, an aeronautical engineer named Cheng Xin is recruited by the Planetary Intelligence Agency (PIA) to work for the Staircase Project, which aims to launch a spy probe toward the Trisolaran fleet at 1% of light-speed to gather intelligence. The seemingly impossible target speed is realized through Cheng's idea of lining up ICBMs, Topol and Dongfeng missiles to create a nuclear catapult. The Planetary Defence Council (PDC) first rejects the plan; because of the sophons, the high relative velocity of the spy probe when reaching the Trisolaran fleet and the Trisolarans probably using too advanced technology for communication, the intelligence value would be practically nil. When Thomas Wade, the CIA agent leading the project, proposes the idea to make the Trisolarans intercept the probe by putting a human into it, who would serve as an object of investigation and therefore could corrupt warfare from the inside and would even be brought back into the Solar System, the plan is accepted. However, the mass of the vehicle is absurdly limited, so Thomas Wade decides to find some person to euthanize, and to send only the deep frozen brain, on the assumption that the Trisolarans will be able to reconstruct the body using DNA and maybe old memories inside the brain as a reference.

Meanwhile, a terminally ill engineer named Yun Tianming recalls his years-long affection for Cheng Xin. Upon receiving an unexpected sum of money by Hu Wen, a former fellow student, he buys the title deed to the distant star DX3906 from the United Nations, which he anonymously bestows upon Cheng. A few days later, Cheng is visited by Hu and informed, that Yun is terminally ill, so she visits him for the first time in years, persuading him to volunteer for the Staircase Project. Upon learning that Yun was the donor of the star, she feels overwhelmed with guilt. When Yun's brain is launched into space, a malfunction causes his spacecraft to go off course into deep space, and he is thought to be lost forever. Afterward, Cheng accepts an opportunity to hibernate, in order to serve as the Staircase Project's liaison for future generations.

Deterrence Era and Broadcast Era 
At the end of The Dark Forest, the Trisolaran invasion was averted owing to Luo's threat of Mutually Assured Destruction (MAD), which involves broadcasting the position of the planet Trisolaris across the universe, thereby attracting the attention of hostile alien races. This system operates on the assumption that alien forces would cleanse such broadcast coordinates. In the event of such a broadcast, Earth would be exposed as well due to its proximity to Trisolaris (4.5 light years) and prior messages exchanged, revealing their relative location. Luo is appointed to be the first Swordholder, the person responsible for launching the broadcast in the event of any further Trisolaran aggression.

With safety restored, the defecting ships Bronze Age and Blue Space are seemingly invited to return. However, upon the return of Bronze Age, its crew is imprisoned for crimes against humanity. The lieutenant commander in charge of targeting systems and attack patterns of Bronze Age, warns Blue Space not to return, so the human ship Gravity and two Trisolaran droplets join forces to chase after Blue Space.

Fifty years pass. Cheng wakes up from hibernation due to her possession of DX3906, whose planets are discovered by an astronomer named AA. Cheng and AA start a company together, and Cheng becomes the leading candidate for the next Swordholder, in part due to her past experience and her status as somebody who owns another world. Wade desires the position and attempts to murder Cheng, but is arrested and thrown in prison. Right after Cheng's inauguration, the Earth is attacked by Trisolaran droplets, and humanity's gravitational-wave transmitters are destroyed, with the Trisolarans correctly guessing that Cheng would not send the MAD broadcast. At the same moment, the two droplets working with Gravity attempt to destroy Gravity and Blue Space. However, the crew-members of Blue Space have discovered a fading "four-dimensional fragment" in space, which they exploit in order to destroy the two droplets and capture Gravity. The crew-members of the two ships make peace, and decide to send out the MAD broadcast using Gravity'''s antenna. Afterward, Gravity joins Blue Space in escaping the solar system.

The Trisolarans, through Sophon, a diplomatic link, propose that the entire human population move to Australia and Mars, where they are to be systematically starved to reduce their numbers to manageable levels. The Trisolarans attack three cities in Asia, North America, and Europe. After the attacks, the people of Earth flee to Australia. Australia becomes overpopulated. Sophon destroys all sources of electricity. When questioned about food sources, she insinuates that cannibalism would occur. Upon detecting the MAD broadcast, the Trisolarans abandon their invasion of the Earth. A few years later, as humanity recovers, one of Trisolaris's three suns is struck by a relativistic "photoid" launched by unspecified aliens, leading to the planet's utter incineration. It is understood that sooner or later, the Solar System will suffer a similar attack.

The remnant Trisolarans reveal that they have Yun in their custody, and allow a single, heavily supervised tele-conference between Yun and Cheng. Yun, having been treated by the Trisolarans as an honored guest, and granted access to the Trisolaran data-banks, delivers a complex fairy tale which contains three cosmological secrets, two of which are subsequently deciphered by the human council: that light-speed travel can be attained by warping space through "curvature propulsion", and that it is possible for a civilisation to reduce the speed of light so that they cannot escape their own star system, thereby forming a "black domain" which no one will attack as its inhabitants cannot affect the space outside.

 Bunker Era 
Humanity decides to heavily invest in space cities possessing artificial light sources, which can hide in the shadow of the solar system's gas giants to escape any photoid attack against the sun. As time goes on, nearly the entire Earth is evacuated. Research into curvature propulsion is banned owing to resentment from the populace, who regard the technology as an escape hatch for the ultra wealthy, and owing to the discovery that such propulsion creates permanent rifts in spacetime. Cheng strongly disagrees with this policy, and accepts a request by Wade, now out of prison, to transfer all of her private wealth to him, so that he may assemble a secret research team.

Cheng hibernates for sixty years, and is woken at Wade's request after the latter's adherents get into an armed standoff with the government. Worried over the danger to civilians caused by Wade's new antimatter bullets, Cheng demands Wade's surrender, reminding him that she has final say in the venture, and Wade reluctantly orders his security forces to stand down. Contrary to expectations, the government shows no mercy to Wade on account of either his voluntary surrender, or the quality of his research. Wade is executed, to Cheng's dismay, and Cheng, feeling that her life has no direction, hibernates for another sixty years with AA before waking up to the news that the alien strike has arrived.

However, the space cities are totally useless: the attack has come in the form of an object which collapses 3D space into two dimensions. The existence of such weapons was the third secret in Yun's story which the interpreters had neglected. The only way to survive is either to flee at light speed, or to have re-engineered one's species to exist in the 2D plane. The entire solar system is flattened and killed, with all ships being sucked in, but Cheng and AA escape using a curvature propulsion ship built in secret by Wade's associates after his death.

 Galaxy Era 
Cheng Xin and AA travel at light speed to Planet Blue, one of the two planets orbiting DX3906. The journey takes 287 years from the Earth's reference frame, but from their perspective, only 52 hours in light speed were spent. There, they encounter Guan Yifan, a civilian cosmologist of Gravity, who explains that the crew of his ship and Blue Space went on to develop curvature propulsion and colonize four planets (in different systems). However, one of those planets became fearful of detection, and placed itself within a Black Domain.

Cheng Xin and Guan Yifan fly to the nearby Planet Gray to investigate signs of alien activity, whereupon they discover Death Lines (similar to black holes) which were laid down by a faction of aliens purposely trying to accelerate the ruin of the universe. At this point, Guan Yifan explains the larger picture to Cheng Xin: the universe is slowly being torn apart by galactic warfare. As a young universe, the universe existed in 10D, and the speed of light was near infinity, meaning light could illuminate any place in the universe in a Planck Time, but as time went on, galactic civilizations continually re-engineered themselves to occupy one fewer dimension, and then tore apart the topmost dimension as a way of killing their enemies. Likewise, some civilizations created black holes to serve as shields against foreign attacks, but this led to the reduction of light speed, owing to the disruption of spacetime.

As Cheng Xin and Guan Yifan fly back to Planet Blue, they are notified by AA that Yun Tianming has arrived. Cheng Xin is overjoyed that they will finally reunite. However, the Death Line suddenly expands and traps their ship within a low light speed black hole that renders their electronics useless. Guan Yifan tells Cheng Xin that modern spaceships are equipped for this, but booting the neural computer will take sixteen days. They hibernate to survive the boot time, but awaken to discover it has worked and they can descend onto Planet Blue. When they are released, they discover that 18 million years have passed in the external universe, and that the speed of light has been reduced by a factor of 10,000. They find a message revealing that AA and Yun Tianming lived a happy life together, and prior to dying left behind a gift for Cheng Xin and Guan Yifan: a pocket universe measuring one cubic kilometer, made with Trisolaran technology, containing an idyllic farmstead to which Cheng Xin and Guan Yifan can retire with the company of Sophon. They wait for the main universe to die and be reborn as the Garden of Eden.

After living there for some time, Cheng Xin and Yifan receive an alien message aimed at all denizens of micro-universes in all languages including Earth's and Trisolaran's, stating that the presence of micro-universes deprives the main universe of mass, disrupting its possibility of eternal cycles of expansion, collapse and rebirth. Cheng Xin, accompanied by Yifan, and wearily reflecting on her lifetime of moral duty, disassembles the objects of the micro-universe and steps back with them into the dying main universe, leaving behind a message in a bottle and also a fishbowl for the reborn universe to uncover.

Characters
 Cheng Xin (程心) – Aerospace engineer from the early 21st century, second Swordholder
 Yun Tianming (云天明) – Cheng Xin's university classmate who has a romantic interest in her; his brain is sent into space and captured by the Trisolaran fleet, who manage to clone his body and return him to life.
 Thomas Wade (托马斯·维德) – Former CIA Chief, most effective candidate for Swordholder, develops curvature propulsion prototype.
 Ai AA (艾AA) – Ph.D. in astronomy from the Deterrence Era, Cheng Xin's friend and traveling companion
 Luo Ji (罗辑) – Cosmic Sociologist, first Sword-holder
Neil Scott – Captain of Bronze AgeSebastian Schneider  – Lieutenant commander of targeting systems and attack patterns aboard Bronze AgeCaptain Morovich – Captain of GravityChu Yan – Captain of Blue Space Sophon (智子) — Trisolaran android, controlled by sophons, who provides a diplomatic and communicative link between Earth and Trisolaris
 Guan Yifan (关一帆) – A civilian astronomer from Gravity Yang Dong (杨冬) – String theorist and daughter of Ye Wenjie and Yang Weining, later committed suicide
 Fraisse (弗赖斯) – Australian Aboriginal man who befriends Cheng Xin during the resettlement 
 Singer – The exterminator on board an observing ship, attacking the Solar System with dual-vector foil.

Trilogy
The additional books in the Remembrance of Earth's Past trilogy are:
 三体 (The Three-Body Problem), 2008; English translation by Ken Liu published by Tor Books in 2014
 黑暗森林 (The Dark Forest''), 2008; English translation by Joel Martinsen published by Tor Books in 2015

Awards

References

External links
 

2010 science fiction novels
Novels by Liu Cixin
Alien invasions in novels
Cryonics in fiction
2010 Chinese novels